Illusions & Mirrors is a 2013 short film directed by Iranian-born American artist and filmmaker Shirin Neshat. The film, shot in black-and-white, stars Tarek Aylouch, Michael Markiewicz, and the Israeli-born American actress Natalie Portman. The film was commissioned by Dior, for which Portman is a spokesmodel, for the Miss Dior Expo at the Grand Palais, Paris. Shirin Neshat said that the film is a tribute to the black-and-white silent films made by such surrealist filmmakers as Man Ray, Jean Cocteau, Luis Buñuel, and Maya Deren.

Plot
The film traces the delusions of a young woman, played by Natalie Portman. She is making futile attempts to follow a phantom travelling through the dunes of an empty sea beach, and, when it comes to an encounter in an abandoned house at the end, the woman finds a disturbing surprise.

Cast
Tarek Aylouch
Michael Markiewicz
Natalie Portman

References

External links
 
 

2013 films
American independent films
American short films
2013 drama films
2013 independent films
2010s English-language films
2010s American films